The Ardristan standing stones are two menhirs near Tullow, County Carlow.

The stones are located 50 metres apart, separated by a road. The larger of the stones is 2.8m tall and has 6 vertical grooves, some of which are artificial.

The stones lie approximate 1 km north/north-west of the Aghade Holed Stone.

References

Archaeological sites in County Carlow
Megalithic monuments in Ireland
Menhirs